Gandoman District is in Borujen County, Chaharmahal and Bakhtiari province, Iran. At the 2006 census, its population was 16,203 in 3,964 households. The following census in 2011 counted 15,768 people in 4,368 households. At the latest census in 2016, the district had 15,803 inhabitants living in 4,694 households.

References 

Borujen County

Districts of Chaharmahal and Bakhtiari Province

Populated places in Chaharmahal and Bakhtiari Province

Populated places in Borujen County